Ashburton is a town on the south-southeastern edge of Dartmoor in Devon, England, adjacent to the A38. The town is 20 miles (32 km) northeast of Plymouth and 17 miles (27 km) southwest of Exeter.

It was formerly important as a stannary town (a centre for the administration of tin-mining), and remains the largest town within the national park. Ashburton has five pubs within the centre of town and five restaurants/cafés. The town is also part of the electoral ward named Ashburton and Buckfastleigh, the population of which at the 2011 census was 7,718.

History 
The town's name derives from the Old English æsc-burna-tun meaning 'farm/settlement with a stream frequented by ash trees'.

The name is recorded in the Domesday Book (1086) as Essebretone. Ashburton was then the main town of the Parish of Ashburton, in Teignbridge Hundred. During the English Civil War, Ashburton was a temporary refuge for Royalist troops fleeing after their defeat by General Fairfax at nearby Bovey Tracey.

The town was the terminus of the Buckfastleigh, Totnes and South Devon Railway that opened on 1 May 1872. Ashburton railway station closed to passengers in November 1958 although goods traffic on the line continued until 7 September 1962.

Ashburton used to be famous for a beverage known as Ashburton Pop, possibly a type of champagne, the recipe of which was lost with the brewer in 1765.

Ashburton Carnival is one of the oldest, possibly the oldest, surviving in Devon. Written records date it back to 1891, but it is believed to have been started in the mid-1880s to raise funds for a new hospital.

Ashburton Golf Club (now defunct) was founded in 1910. The club continued into the 1920s.

Ashmoor Hockey Club was formed in 2003 and plays at South Dartmoor Community College.

Politics 
Ashburton was the first place to elect a candidate of the Official Monster Raving Loony Party to public office. The candidate was Alan Hope, a local publican, who was elected unopposed to Ashburton Town Council in 1989. He subsequently became deputy mayor and later mayor of Ashburton.

The town is one of a few to still annually appoint a portreeve or 'port warden'. Others are Laugharne, Beccles, Callington (where the name is given to the council chairman), Cheevel, and Yeovil.

Sites of interest 

The parish church of St Andrew is a Grade One Building and a fine building of the 15th century with a tall tower and two aisles. The 15th-century church tower includes sculptures by Herbert Edmund Read (1885–1951), who also carved the oak reredos; this is not the art historian Herbert Read. One window has stained glass designed by C. E. Kempe. The porch is partly Norman.

St Lawrence Chapel is a Grade II* Listed Building in St Lawrence Lane in the centre of the town. Originally a chantry chapel and then a grammar school for over 600 years, St Lawrence Chapel is now an important heritage, cultural and community centre, managed by the Guild of St Lawrence.

The town's old Methodist Church (Grade II listed) at 15 West St was built in 1835. In 2015 the Methodist congregation moved to the nearby St Andrew's Church Hall. Their previous building was sold by public auction on 19 July 2017, when it was bought by Ashburton Arts Ltd (a not-for-profit company limited by guarantee) using funds donated or loaned by members of the community. The building now houses Ashburton Arts Centre.

St Gudula's Well and Cross in Old Totnes Road is probably named after St Gulval, also honoured at the village of Gulval in Cornwall.

The Rippon Tor Rifle Range lies within five miles of Ashburton.

Ashburton Town Hall was originally built as a market hall in 1850.

International relations

Twin towns - sister cities 

  Ardmore, County Waterford, Ireland
  Ashburton, Canterbury, New Zealand
  Cléder, Finistère, Brittany, France

See also
Creedy, Sandford

References

External links 

 Official town website
 
 Devon Local Studies - Ashburton community page
 
 

 
Towns in Devon
Dartmoor
Market towns in Devon
Teignbridge